The coat of arms of the Republic of Kosovo was introduced following the unilateral declaration of independence on 17 February 2008. It shows six white stars in an arc above a solid golden shape of Kosovo as seen on a standard projection map, placed on a rounded triangular shield with a blue field and a  golden border. Its central figures, the stars and the shape, are also the content of the new blue flag of Kosovo, already adopted at the same time.

Government emblems
Some of the institutions of Kosovo have adopted their own distinct emblems to represent themselves.

History

Symbols used during United Nations administration

The Constitutional Charter for Provisional Self-Government in Kosovo, promulgated by United Nations Mission in Kosovo (UNMIK) in May 2001, stated that "The Provisional Institutions of Self-Government shall use only such symbols as are or as may be set forth in UNMIK legislation.

The emblem of the Provisional Institutions of Self-Government was adopted in 2003. The emblem depicted a map of Kosovo in gold on a blue background surrounded by two olive branches, in the style of those found used in the emblem of the United Nations, above which were three gold stars and three double spirals ornamentation which is a traditional symbol of ancient Dardania and represents the rotating sun.

During the period of administration by UNMIK, two regulations relating to the use of symbols were made:

UNMIK regulation UNMIK/REG/2000/30 (20 May 2000) "ON STAMPS AND HEADINGS OF OFFICIAL DOCUMENTS OF COURTS, PROSECUTORS’ OFFICES AND PENAL ESTABLISHMENTS" states that the stamps of courts and penal establishments should contain "The emblem of the United Nations with “UNMIK” added to the top of the emblem" and the word "“Kosovo” in Albanian, Serbian and English"
ADMINISTRATIVE DIRECTION NO. 2003/15 (2 July 2003) "IMPLEMENTING UNMIK REGULATION NO. 2001/9 ON A CONSTITUTIONAL FRAMEWORK FOR PROVISIONAL SELF-GOVERNMENT IN KOSOVO" Establishes an approved logo for the Provisional Institutions of Self Government.

Municipal emblems

The Municipalities of Kosovo have each adopted distinct coats or arms, seals or emblems.

See also 

Flag of Kosovo
List of flags of Kosovo
National symbols of Kosovo

Notes

a.

References

Kosovo
National symbols of Kosovo
Kosovo
Kosovo
Kosovo